Gemmula rarimaculata is a species of sea snail, a marine gastropod mollusk in the family Turridae, the turrids.

Description
The length of the shell varies between 17 mm and 27 mm.

Distribution
This species occurs in the Indian Ocean; in the Solomon Sea; off Japan; in the South China Sea; off the Fiji Islands, Queensland, Western Australia and the Philippines.

References

 Kuroda, T.; Habe, T.; Oyama, K. (1971). The sea shells of Sagami Bay. Maruzen Co., Tokyo. xix, 1-741 (Japanese text), 1-489 (English text), 1-51 (Index), pls 1-121
 Okutani, T. 2000. Marine mollusks in Japan. Tokyo : Tokai University Press 1173 pp.
 Liu, J.Y. [Ruiyu] (ed.). (2008). Checklist of marine biota of China seas. China Science Press. 1267 pp
 Steyn, D.G & Lussi, M. (2005). Offshore Shells of Southern Africa: A pictorial guide to more than 750 Gastropods. Published by the authors. Pp. i–vi, 1–289.
 Li B. [Baoquan] & Li X. [Xinzheng]. (2008). Report on the turrid genera Gemmula, Lophiotoma and Ptychosyrinx (Gastropoda: Turridae: Turrinae) from the China seas. Zootaxa. 1778: 1-25.

External links
  Tucker, J.K. 2004 Catalog of recent and fossil turrids (Mollusca: Gastropoda). Zootaxa 682:1-1295.

rarimaculata
Gastropods described in 1971